YOU FM is one of the radio networks owned and operated by Hessischer Rundfunk, the public broadcaster for the German state of Hesse. Originally operating under the name hr XXL, the network featured the popular show XXL Clubnights which highlighted the night club scene in Hesse. In January 2004, the network was renamed YOU FM ("Young Fresh Music"), partially in an attempt to divest itself of its old "techno station" image.

YOU FM now offers a more traditional mix of mainstream music and niche talk shows, similar to its sister station hr3, but with a more youthful flavor. It operates a 24-hour format, but from 1:00 to 5:30 AM it broadcasts a computerized music feed.

Reception
YOU FM can be received in much of north and east Hesse on the following frequencies:

 Bensheim 90,2 
 Darmstadt 98,2 
 Eschwege 106,6 
 Frankfurt 90,4 
 Fulda 93,6 
 Gießen 97,7
 Gelnhausen 99,4 
 Hanau 90,4 
 Kassel 100,1 
 Limburg 90,7 
 Marburg 93,9 
 Michelstadt 91,0 
 Offenbach 90,4 
 Rüdesheim 92,3 
 Schlüchtern 88,2 
 Wetzlar 105,5 
 Wiesbaden 99,7 
 Witzenhausen 91,1

References

Radio stations in Germany
Radio stations established in 2004
2004 establishments in Germany
Mass media in Frankfurt
Hessischer Rundfunk